Michael A. Cremo (born July 15, 1948), also known by his devotional name Drutakarmā dāsa, is an American freelance researcher who describes himself as a Vedic creationist and an "alternative archeologist." He argues that humans have lived on Earth for millions of years. Based on artifacts allegedly found in the Eocene auriferous gravels of Table Mountain, California and discussed in his book Forbidden Archeology, Cremo argues for the existence of modern humans on Earth as early as 30 to 40 million years ago. Forbidden Archeology, which he wrote with Richard L. Thompson, has attracted criticism from mainstream scholars, who describe it as pseudoscientific.

Early life and education
Cremo was born in Schenectady, New York. Cremo's father, Salvatore Cremo, was a United States military intelligence officer. Michael Cremo lived with his family in Germany, where he went to high school. They spent several summers traveling throughout Europe. He attended George Washington University from 1966 to 1968, then served in the United States Navy.

Religious views
Cremo is a member of the International Society for Krishna Consciousness (ISKCON) and the Bhaktivedanta Institute. He has written several books and articles about Hindu spirituality using the pen-name Drutakarmā dāsa. He has also been a contributing editor to the magazine Back to Godhead and a bhakti yoga teacher. Cremo told Contemporary Authors that he decided to devote his life to Krishna in the early 1970s, after receiving a copy of the Bhagavad Gita at a Grateful Dead concert. In the end of the 1990s he authored a paper on the official ISKCON statement on capital punishment. His work on "Puranic Time and the Archaeological Record" was published in ISKCON Communications Journal and Time and Archaeology.

Forbidden Archeology

Cremo's central claim in Forbidden Archeology is that humans have lived on Earth for tens to hundreds of millions of years, and that the scientific establishment has suppressed the fossil evidence of extreme human antiquity. In case of grooved spheres from pyrophyllite mines of Ottosdal, South Africa, Cremo proposes that they might be man-made artifacts, possibly as far back as 2.8 billion years ago. Forbidden Archeology has been criticized by mainstream scholars from a variety of disciplines.

Publications
 
 Cremo, M A. (1999) "Puranic Time and the Archeological Record". In Tim Murray, ed. Time and Archaeology, Routledge, London,
Cremo, M. A. (2002) "The Later Discoveries of Boucher de Perthes at Moulin Quignon and Their Impact on the Moulin Quignon Jaw Controversy". In Goulven Laurent ed. Proceedings of the XXth International Congress of History of Science (Liege, 20–26 July 1997), Volume X, Earth Sciences, Geography and Cartography. Turnhout, Belgium: Brepols, pp. 39–56
Cremo, M. A. (2009) "The discoveries of Carlos Ribeiro: a controversial episode in nineteenth-century European archeology", Journal of Iberian Archaeology, vol. 12: 69-89.
Cremo, M. A. (2008) "Excavating the eternal: an indigenous archaeological tradition in India", Antiquity, 82:178-188.
Cremo, M. A. (2008) "Some Angles on the Anglo Debate", Archaeologies: Journal of the World Archaeological Congress, 4(1): 164-167.

Recent years
In recent years, Cremo has organized a number of conferences where ISKCON-associated academics exchanged views and experiences. In March 2009, Cremo appeared in a History Channel television series called Ancient Aliens, and in 2010 in a mini series of the same name.

See also
Gaudiya Vaishnavism
Creationism

References

External links

1948 births
Living people
American Hindus
American male writers
Writers from Schenectady, New York
Pseudohistorians
American Hare Krishnas
George Washington University alumni
Hindu creationists
Creationism
Creation science
20th-century American writers
21st-century American writers
Proponents of alternative chronologies
Pseudoarchaeologists
Pseudoscience